Leandro Calixto Zago (born 27 May 1981) is a Brazilian football coach, currently in charge of the under-20 team of Fortaleza.

Career
Born in Campinas, São Paulo, Zago began his career as a fitness coach at hometown side Campinas FC in 2008, before moving to Desportivo Brasil in 2010 as an assistant coach. In March of the following year, he moved to Pão de Açúcar EC, also as an assistant.

Zago joined Corinthians in October 2011, after being named manager of the under-15 squad. He left in May 2013 to join Guarani, as an assistant of the main squad.

In July 2014, Zago was appointed manager of Ferroviária's under-20 team. He moved to Palmeiras in September of the following year, in the same category but as an assistant of João Burse, and left in February 2016 to take over Ponte Preta, also in the under-20s.

On 27 February 2018, Zago was named manager of Atlético Mineiro's under-17 squad, and was appointed in charge of the club's under-20s on 28 June of the following year. During the 2020 season, he was in charge of the first team for three Série A matches as Jorge Sampaoli and his staff were on quarantine after a COVID-19 outbreak in the squad.

Zago left Galo on 18 March 2021, and was named manager of Série D side Joinville on 26 April. He left the club on 25 October with only two losses, and was named at the helm of Botafogo-SP on 19 November.

On 23 May 2022, Zago was sacked by Botafogo, after three defeats his last four matches.

References

External links

1981 births
Living people
Sportspeople from Campinas
Brazilian football managers
Campeonato Brasileiro Série A managers
Campeonato Brasileiro Série C managers
Campeonato Brasileiro Série D managers
Clube Atlético Mineiro managers
Joinville Esporte Clube managers
Botafogo Futebol Clube (SP) managers